The 1976 Air Canada Silver Broom was held at the Memorial Auditorium in Duluth, Minnesota, United States from March 22–28, 1976.

Teams

*Throws second rocks.

Round-robin standings

Round-robin results

Draw 1

Draw 2

Draw 3

Draw 4

Draw 5

Draw 6

Draw 7

Draw 8

Draw 9

Tie-breaker

Playoffs

Semifinals

Final

References

External links

World Men's Curling Championship
Curling
Air Canada Silver Broom, 1976
1976 in sports in Minnesota
Curling in Minnesota
Sports competitions in Duluth, Minnesota
20th century in Duluth, Minnesota
International curling competitions hosted by the United States
March 1976 sports events in the United States